Kaynanalar, which started in 1974, is the first and longest-running Turkish sit-com (and also first and longest-running Turkish TV series), lasting 30 years.

Cast
 Tekin Akmansoy - Nuri Kantar
 Leman Çıdamlı - Nuriye Kantar
 Defne Yalnız - Döndü
 Sevda Aydan - Tijen Hakmen
 Ege Aydan - Timuçin Hakmen
 Münir Caner - Katip Kerim
 Sermin Hürmeriç - Nur Hakmen
 Haşim Hekimoğlu - Timur Hakmen
 Gültekin Gülkan - Şerafettin

External links
 Kaynanalar

1974 Turkish television series debuts
1970s Turkish television series
Turkish comedy television series
Turkish Radio and Television Corporation original programming
Kanal D original programming
2005 Turkish television series endings
Television shows set in Istanbul
Television series produced in Istanbul
Turkish television series endings